Edward James Boyle Sr. (October 11, 1913 – July 24, 2002) was a United States district judge of the United States District Court for the Eastern District of Louisiana.

Education and career

Born in McDonoughville, Louisiana, Boyle received a Bachelor of Laws from Loyola University New Orleans College of Law in 1935. He was in private practice in New Orleans, Louisiana  from 1935 to 1942 and again from 1945 to 1966. He was an Assistant United States Attorney of the Eastern District of Louisiana from 1942 to 1945.

Federal judicial service

On August 16, 1966, Boyle was nominated by President Lyndon B. Johnson to a seat on the United States District Court for the Eastern District of Louisiana vacated by Judge Robert A. Ainsworth Jr. He was confirmed by the United States Senate on October 20, 1966, and received his commission on November 3, 1966. He assumed senior status on December 1, 1981. Boyle served in that capacity until his death in New Orleans on July 24, 2002.

References

Sources
 

1913 births
2002 deaths
Loyola University New Orleans College of Law alumni
Judges of the United States District Court for the Eastern District of Louisiana
United States district court judges appointed by Lyndon B. Johnson
20th-century American judges
Lawyers from New Orleans
Assistant United States Attorneys